Kaan Altan is a founding member of the Turkish rock band Mavi Sakal. He currently performs in the band Kesmeşeker as a guitarist.

References 

Year of birth missing (living people)
Living people
Turkish rock guitarists
Tarsus American College alumni